Khamlangba, also spelt as Khamlangpa, is a deity in Meitei mythology and religion of Ancient Kangleipak (Antique Manipur).  He is the God of iron, mining, metallurgy, steel manufacturing, hunting and war. His occupation is the extraction of the iron ores and the manufacture of steel. The Khamlangba Thenlon text mentions about his skills of iron metallurgy and blacksmith in ancient Kakching kingdom.

Description 
God Khamlangba is the miner of iron ores and the manufacturer of steel. He is worshipped for peace and prosperity in the kingdom. He is revered for protecting people from diseases and death. He drives away the evil spirits from the state. He belongs to the class of Sylvan Gods (Umang Lais).

The Kangjeirol text mentions that God Khamlangba was one of the divine polo players who played the divine polo match of the gods.

Mythology 
In the creation myth, God Khamlangba was grown out of Atiya Sidaba. He was a great hunter, warrior and miner. He lived with Goddess Huimu Leima and a son named Amudon was born to them. After this, Khamlangba left Ancient Kangleipak (Antique Manipur) for Tripura in search of iron ores. When he returned to Ancient Kangleipak (Antique Manipur), he settled in Kakching. The people of Kakching worshipped Him. Later, "Kakching Haraoba", a new form of Lai Haraoba was developed. This account is evident in the Khamlangba Khunggumlon text.

In another legend, God Khamlangba stayed for some time at a place named "Khuman Heiyel Loubuk". Later, he came to Kheraching. A person named Nganba Tekcha Pamba Laihat Thouba beheaded Irum Lai Tubi Kokling Lengba. So, the place where God Khamlangba stayed was later known as Kakching Khullen and Kakching Wairi.

God Khamlangba participated in the divine polo match played among the gods. The divine polo match took place during the reign of the deified Meetei King Nongda Lairen Pakhangba as described in the Kangjeirol text. He was one of the 7 polo players in the northern team. His team was led by God Marjing. On the other hand, his opponent's team (southern team) was led by God Thangjing.

Cults and shrines 
God Khamlangba holds a special position for the Kakching Haraoba. Kakching Haraoba is one of the four types of Lai Haraoba festival.

During the era of King Samuroiba Ningthou, the temple of Khamlangba was built in Kakching Khullen. The Naorem clan also built a temple of Khamlangba at Kakching Wairi. The temple of Khamlangba in Kakching Khullen was maintained by the Mayanglambam family while the one at Kakching Wairi was maintained by Naorem family.

Gallery

See also 
 Loyalakpa
 Mongba Hanba

References

Bibliography 
 Khamlangba Erengba Puwaree Neinarol by Yaima, Lamgdum
 Kakching Haraoba by Meitei, Pukhrambam Bharat
 Kakching Haraoba Anisuba Saruk by Meitei, Pukhrambam Bharat

External links 

 Khamlangba_archive.org

Abundance deities
Abundance gods
Arts deities
Arts gods
Knowledge deities
Knowledge gods
Magic deities
Magic gods
Maintenance deities
Maintenance gods
Smithing deities
Smithing gods
Time and fate deities
Time and fate gods
War deities
War gods
Wisdom deities
Wisdom gods